Flibbidydibbidydob is an EP of cover versions, including commercial jingles and a TV theme, by English punk rock band, Snuff. It was originally released in 1990 by Workers Playtime Records in the UK, and was later re-released in August 1996 on Fat Wreck Chords.

Track listing
"Rods and Mockers" – 1:26     
"Do Nothing" (The Specials)– 2:15     
"Shake 'N' Vac" (from the commercial for the carpet freshener)– 0:49      
"I Can't Explain" (The Who) – 1:53     
"Ecstacy" – 2:03     
"Reach Out (I'll Be There)" (The Four Tops) – 2:05     
"Hazy Shade of Winter" (Simon & Garfunkel) – 1:51      
"Do It Quick" (from the Do It All DIY chain commercial)– 0:53      
"City Baby Attacked by Rats" (GBH) – 1:40      
"Bran Flakes" (from the Kellogg's cereal commercial)– 0:52      
"In Sickness and In Health" (Chas & Dave - the theme from the TV series) – 1:54

Credits
 Duncan Redmonds – vocals, drums
 Simon Wells – guitar
 Andy Crighton – bass
 Dave Redmonds – trombone (credited as "New Improved Dave On Bone")
 Produced by Snuff

External links
Fat Wreck Chords EP page

1999 EPs
Snuff (band) albums
Covers EPs
Fat Wreck Chords EPs